U.S. Navy Fighters is a video game developed and published by Electronic Arts for the PC. An expansion pack, Marine Fighters, was released in 1995. U.S. Navy Fighters: Gold was also released in 1995, it is a compilation package that includes both the main game and the expansion. U.S. Navy Fighters is a forerunner to Jane's Combat Simulations series. An updated version, Jane's US Navy Fighters 97, was released in 1996 for Microsoft Windows and is officially part of the series.

Gameplay
U.S. Navy Fighters is a flight simulator using five different jet fighters, with 50 missions of varying types.

Reception

Next Generation reviewed the game, rating it four stars out of five, and stated that "despite heavy system requirements, this is a must for every flight freak".

Reviews
PC Gamer Vol. 2, #2 (February 1995)
 Score #13 (Jan 1995) - Czech magazine
 Computer Gaming World (Feb, 1995)
 PC Gamer (Feb, 1995)
 PC Games - Jan, 1995

References

1994 video games
Combat flight simulators
DOS games
DOS-only games
Electronic Arts franchises
Electronic Arts games
Video games developed in the United States
Video games with expansion packs